Waneshwar Mahadev Temple is a temple founded by Daityaraj Wanasur and dedicated to Shiva. The temple lies in the village of Jinayi, in the Derapur subdivision of the Kanpur Dehat district, Uttar Pradesh, India.

History
According to historian Laxmikant Tripathi, Sithaupurwa (Sronitpur) was the capital of Daityaraj Mahabali's son Daityaraj Wanasur. Wanasur founded a huge shivling in this temple. After a war between Shri Krishna and Wanasur the temple was demolished. Janmejay renovated by the son of Parikshit was named Wanpura Janmejay. Near the temple are a pond, Usha Burj, and statue of Vishnu. These are signs that authenticate mythology.

Transport
The temple is also connected by road with Kanpur.

Ling of Lord Shiva

Fair
During Mahashivratri Parv each year, a fifteen-day-long fair takes place. Devotees from the districts of Kanpur Dehat, Jalaun, Hamirpur and Banda worship Lord Shiva of Waneshwar with Ganges water on their return from Lodheshwar (Barabanki).

Gallery

References

Shiva temples in Uttar Pradesh
Kanpur Dehat district
Hindu temples in Uttar Pradesh